Athota is a village in Guntur district of the Indian state of Andhra Pradesh. It is located in Kollipara mandal of Tenali revenue division.

Geography 

Demographics 

It comprises  males,  females and  children (age group of 0–6 years). The children include 257 boys and 254 girls. The average literacy rate stands at 64.96% with  literates, of these males are 828 (32.65%) and females literates are 1144 (44.32%). There are a total of  workers and  non–workers.

Governance 

Athota gram panchayat is the local self-government of the village. It is divided into wards and each ward is represented by a ward member. The village forms a part of Andhra Pradesh Capital Region and is under the jurisdiction of APCRDA. It belongs to Tenali (Assembly constituency) for Andhra Pradesh Legislative Assembly, which in turn is a part of Guntur (Lok Sabha constituency).

Education 

As per the school information report for the academic year 2018–19, the village has 6 schools. These include one private and one ZPHS and four Mandal Parishad schools.

See also 
List of villages in Guntur district

References 

Villages in Guntur district